Keelhaul may refer to:

 Keelhauling, a form of corporal punishment used against sailors
 Operation Keelhaul, the repatriation of Russian prisoners of war after World War II
 Keelhaul (band), American band from Ohio
 Keel-Haul (G.I. Joe), a character in the fictional G.I. Joe universe